Hemp or industrial hemp is a strain of the Cannabis sativa plant grown specifically for the industrial uses of its derived products.

Hemp may also refer to:

Plants 
 Cannabis, a genus of plants
 Cannabis (drug), the use of several species of Cannabis (C. sativa, C. indica, C. ruderalis) as drugs, including marijuana and hashish
 Cannabis cultivation, cultivation of the plants to produce drugs
 Boehmeria cylindrica, bog hemp, native to the Americas
 Crotalaria juncea, also known as "brown hemp", "Indian hemp", "Madras Hemp"
 Jute (genus Corchorus), particularly:
Corchorus olitorius, the primary source of jute fibre
 Kenaf (Hibiscus cannabinus), also known as "Ambari hemp" and "Deccan hemp"
 Manila hemp (Musa textilis), also known as abacá
 Phormium tenax, New Zealand hemp 
 Roselle (plant) (Hibiscus sabdariffa), known as "Roselle hemp"
 Sisal (Agave sisalana), known also as "sisal hemp"

Industrial and home products 
 Hemp hurds, hemp wood, the inner portion of the hemp stalk separated from the fiber
 Hemp jewelry, made from hemp cord, rope, or thread
 Hemp juice, a non-psychoactive drink cold-pressed from cannabis leaves and flowers
 Hemp milk, plant milk made from cannabis seeds
 Hemp oil, extracted from cannabis seeds
 Hemp protein, the protein content of hemp seeds

Entertainment and media 
 Hemp for Victory, 1942 USDA film encouraging farmers to grow cannabis hemp for the WWII war effort
 Hemp Museum Gallery, a cannabis culture museum located in Spain
 Moscow Hemp Fest, an annual cannabis festival held in Idaho
 Planet Hemp, a Brazilian rap rock musical group

Organizations 
 European Industrial Hemp Association, a consortium of the hemp-processing industry
 Hemp Industries Association, a non-profit trade group representing hemp companies, researchers and supporters
 HEMP Party, "Help End Marijuana Prohibition," an Australian cannabis rights political party
 International Hemp Building Association, an organization of hemp manufacturers

Other uses 
 Hemp, Georgia, a community in the United States
 Hemp (surname), people with the name
 Hemp rights, legal protections for marijuana consumers
 High-altitude Electromagnetic Pulse (H.E.M.P.), a high-altitude nuclear electromagnetic pulse bomb
 Old Hemp (1893-1901), a stud dog

See also 
 Cannabis (disambiguation)
 Dagga (disambiguation)
 Ganja (disambiguation)
 Hemp in Kentucky
 Marijuana (disambiguation)
 List of hemp products
 List of names for hemp